Samina sadaat is a town and union council of Dera Ghazi Khan District in the Punjab province of Pakistan
probably its name is given on the basis of 2 historical figures as [(Suleman khan sameen)] and [(Syed Abdullah Shah)] as Shah Sahb came in Samina for the sake of dawah and Suleman khan sameen allotted him some land so could live here that is why that place is called Samina Sadat. The town is located on the bank of the Indus River.

References

Populated places in Dera Ghazi Khan District
Union councils of Dera Ghazi Khan District
Cities and towns in Punjab, Pakistan